KQV is a Pittsburgh, Pennsylvania radio station that broadcast on 1410 kHz since 1919.

KQV may also refer to:
 WDVE, a Pittsburgh, Pennsylvania radio station that originally broadcast as KQV-FM from 1962 to 1971
 WKQV, a Cowen, West Virginia radio station whose call letters are a nod to KQV in Pittsburgh, Pennsylvania
 Kings Quest V, a video game produced in 1990 by Sierra Online